The Lake Sidi Ali trout (Salmo pallaryi) is an extinct species of salmonid fish that inhabited a single lake in the Atlas mountains of northern Morocco, at higher than 2000 metres elevation. It went extinct in the 1930s, probably because of introduction of common carp in the lake. Only two individuals remain in museum collections.

References

External links
Bo Delling and Ignacio Doadrio (2005) Systematics of the trouts endemic to Moroccan lakes (abstract) Swedish Museum of Natural History website.

pallaryi
Freshwater fish of North Africa
Endemic fauna of Morocco
Fish described in 1924
Taxa named by Jacques Pellegrin
Taxonomy articles created by Polbot
Fish extinctions since 1500